Marysville is a small, unincorporated community in northwestern Cooke County, Texas, USA.  It lies approximately 3 miles from the Texas-Oklahoma border.

History
In the spring of 1859, California natives Richard Corn and his wife, Mary Fitch Corn, settled in the vicinity of Sivell's Bend just south of the Red River. After residing in the community for several years, Corn decided to move a few miles southwest along Fish Creek in the area that came to be known as Marysville in the winter of 1866-67. Corn soon discovered that the loose sandy soil wasn't adequate for farming, so he began erecting a large sawmill in the valley of South Fish Creek that spring. 
When D.H. Sapp and his family arrived later in the summer, Corn was in the process of building the mill along with the assistance of mechanic William DeWees. The Sapps aided in the mill's completion the following spring.

The sawmill encompassed approximately 3,000 square feet of space, according to D.H. Sapp's accounts, and boasted a forty-foot tread mill that was powered by 6-10 oxen. It proved to be a successful investment for Corn. There was no other local sawmill in the area for several more years afterwards, so people from Montague and Clay Counties as well as southern Indian Territory would travel to Corn's mill to have their wheat and corn ground.

It was around this time that R.A. Fitch, Corn's brother-in-law, arrived from Marysville, CA to live with his sister. He discussed the idea of establishing a town with D.H. Sapp and Corn that winter and planned to put in some merchandise near the mill. When the Sapps built a home just south of present-day Marysville, Fitch moved their old cabin to the mill. Here, he opened a small general store that spring of 69'. The new "town" was dubbed "Marysville" by Fitch and Corn in honor of their home town in California as well as a reference to Mary Fitch Corn's name.

Two years later, in March 1871, a man by the name of F.M. Savage arrived in Marysville. The town had not prospered as quickly as Corn and Fitch had hoped as Savage only recalled six permanent dwellings on the site. Mr. Savage's father, William Savage, soon followed his son the area and built a steam sawmill. Old Man Savage, a retired surveyor, was asked by Corn and Fitch to make a plat for the townsite. The population had doubled by the following year.

The Savages later built a large general merchandise store, the first building of lumber in Marysville. Their mill, which converted adjacent timber into lumber, was essential in providing the town with the materials its residents needed in erecting buildings.

The Marysville vicinity was a rather rough place in its early years. Contrabands and Civil War refugees had fled to the Chickasaw Nation at the conclusion of the war and Marysville received its fair share if visitations due to its close proximity. Mr. Savage recalled that crime in the area didn't die down until an incident involving the two horse thieves left both culprits lynched in the center of town from an oak tree. "Marysville was free of thieves for five years afterwards," Savage wrote.

Soon, the community enjoyed a period of economic growth. The Baptist church, which still operates today, was built in 1872. In 1873, a post office opened. By 1900, the small community reported 250 citizens, a drugstore, livery, school, churches, and multiple cotton gins.  By 1942, Marysville reported a population of 160.  With the establishment of Camp Howze that same year, Marysville farmers and residents lost most of their land to eminent domain as the camp virtually enveloped the community.  Land to the north, east, and south of the community became part of the camp and farmers were forced to move.  With the loss of farm land, many residents moved to Gainesville or elsewhere to start anew and Marysville rapidly declined.  During the operation of Camp Howze, Marysville was so remote that residents were allowed permanent passes to cross the army camp to get to and from Gainesville.  When World War II ended and Camp Howze was deemed excess in 1946, the original farmers were offered their land back.  Most had settled elsewhere and were not interested in returning, but a few repurchased their land and moved back to the area.  The damage was done and Marysville never recovered.  Today it has a church, a Masonic Lodge known as Fish Creek Lodge #344 and no businesses, and is not reachable by paved road.  One local resident of the Marysville Cemetery is Daniel Montague after whom Montague County, Texas is named.

Education
Marysville enjoyed the luxury of a multiple teacher school district for over half a century. But when Camp Howze swept through the area, 75% of the school's pupils relocated. For a few years, it was consolidated with the nearby Hays School, which was also affected by Camp Howze. When the war came to an end in 1945, Marysville-Hays was incorporated into the growing Muenster School District along with several other rural school houses. Marysville is still currently served by the Muenster Independent School District.

References

Unincorporated communities in Texas
Unincorporated communities in Cooke County, Texas